The Rainbow Man (known as La valle delle rose in Italy) is a 1929 American pre-Code musical drama film. A copy of The Rainbow Man is preserved by the Library of Congress Packard Campus.

Cast
Eddie Dowling as Rainbow Ryan
Marian Nixon as Mary Lane
Frankie Darro as Billy Ryan
Sam Hardy as Doc Hardy
Lloyd Ingraham as Colonel Lane
George 'Gabby' Hayes as Bill (credited as George Hayes)
Dannie Mac Grant as (uncredited)

Soundtrack
 "Sleepy Valley"
Written by James F. Hanley and Andrew Sterling
 "Little Pal"
Written by James F. Hanley and Eddie Dowling
 "Rainbow Man"
Written by James F. Hanley and Eddie Dowling

Trivia
The Rainbow Man was the film debut of George 'Gabby' Hayes (billed as "George Hayes").

Critical response
A New York Times review stated that: "The Rainbow Man is an ingenuous stream of slow music and tears, with occasional interludes of more or less effective comedy. Those in the theatre laughed heartily at the fun, and for all one knows they may have shed tears over the distressing state of affairs that surround Rainbow Ryan (Mr. Dowling). Sometimes the incidents are reminiscent of ancient melodramas, for one perceives the most amazing coincidences throughout the picture."

References

External links

1929 films
American musical drama films
1920s musical drama films
American black-and-white films
1929 drama films
Films directed by Fred C. Newmeyer
Paramount Pictures films
1920s English-language films
1920s American films